The Hunter 32 Vision is an American sailboat, that was introduced in 1988.

Production
The design was built by Hunter Marine in the United States between 1988 and 1994. The design is out of production.

Design

The Hunter 32 Vision is a small recreational keelboat, built predominantly of fiberglass. It has a free-standing fractional sloop rig, an internally-mounted spade-type rudder and a fixed fin keel. It displaces  and carries  of ballast.

The boat has a PHRF racing average handicap of 177 with a high of 192 and low of 165.

See also
List of sailing boat types

Related development
Hunter 36 Vision

Similar sailboats
Aloha 32
Bayfield 30/32
Beneteau 323
C&C 32
Catalina 320
Columbia 32
Contest 32 CS
Douglas 32
Hunter 326
Mirage 32
Morgan 32
Nonsuch 324
Ontario 32
Ranger 32
Watkins 32

References

External links

Official sales brochure

Keelboats
1980s sailboat type designs
Sailing yachts
Sailboat types built by Hunter Marine